Action may refer to:
 Action (narrative), a literary mode
 Action fiction, a type of genre fiction
 Action game, a genre of video game

Film 
 Action film, a genre of film
 Action (1921 film), a film by John Ford
 Action (1980 film), a film by Tinto Brass
 Action 3D, a 2013 Telugu language film
 Action (2019 film), a Kollywood film.

Music 
 Action (music), a characteristic of a stringed instrument
 Action (piano), the mechanism which drops the hammer on the string when a key is pressed
 The Action, a 1960s band

Albums 
 Action (B'z album) (2007)
 Action! (Desmond Dekker album) (1968)
 Action Action Action or Action, a 1965 album by Jackie McLean
 Action! (Oh My God album) (2002)
 Action (Oscar Peterson album) (1968)
 Action (Punchline album) (2004)
 Action (Question Mark & the Mysterians album) (1967)
 Action (Uppermost album) (2011)
 Action (EP), a 2012 EP by NU'EST
 Action, a 1984 album by Kiddo

Songs 
 "Action" (Freddy Cannon song) (1965), the theme song to the TV series Where the Action Is
 "Action" (Sweet song) (1975), covered by various artists
 "Action", a version of "Feeling This" by Blink-182
 "Action", a 1994 song by Terror Fabulous featuring Nadine Sutherland
 "Action", a 1984 song by The Fits
 "Action", a 1960 song by Lance Fortune
 "Action", a 1988 song by Pearly Gates
 "Action", a 1988 song by Girlschool from Take a Bite
 "Action", a 1989 song by Gorky Park from Gorky Park (album)
 "Action", a 2003 song by Powerman 5000 from Transform
 "Action", a 1972 song by Scorpions from Lonesome Crow
 "Actions", a 1980 song by The Stingrays
 "Action Action Action Action Action", a 2008 song by We Are the Physics from We Are the Physics Are OK at Music

Literature 
 Action (comics), a British comic book published in 1976–1977
 Action Comics, a DC Comics comic book series
Action: A Book about Sex, a 2016 book by Amy Rose Spiegel
 Action (newspaper), a newspaper of Oswald Mosley's British Union of Fascists

People 
 Action Bronson (born 1983), American rapper, reality television star, author, and talk show host

Television and radio 
 Action (Canadian TV channel)
 Action (French TV channel)
 The Action Channel (US TV channel), a subsidiary of Luken Communications
 Action (radio), a 1945 radio program
 Action (TV series), a comedy series on Fox in 1999–2000
 CBS Action (2009–2018), now known as CBS Justice
 Sky Sports Action, a TV channel

Theatre 
 Action (theatre), a principle in Western theatre practice
 Action (play), a 1975 play by Sam Shepard

Organizations

Businesses 
 Action (store), a Dutch discount store chain with branches in many European countries
 Action (supermarkets), an Australian supermarket chain
 Actions Semiconductor, a Chinese semiconductor company
 ACTION, an Australian public transport company
 The Action Network (branded as Action), an American sports betting analytics company

Political parties 
 Action (Cypriot political party), a Cypriot political alliance
 Action (Greek political party), a Greek political party
 Action (Italian political party), an Italian political party

Other organizations
 ACTION (U.S. government agency), a former US government federal domestic volunteer agency

Science, technology, and mathematics 
 Action (physics), an attribute of the dynamics of a physical system
 Action at a distance, an outdated term for nonlocal interaction in physics
 Group action (mathematics)
 Continuous group action
 Semigroup action
  Ring Action (mathematics)
 Action (firearms), the mechanism that manipulates cartridges and/or seals the breech
 Action! (programming language), for the Atari 8-bit family of microcomputers
 Action (UML), in the Unified Modeling Language
 Dudek Action, a Polish paraglider design
 Diia, a brand of e-governance in Ukraine

Other uses 
 Action (philosophy), something which is done by a person
 Lawsuit or action

See also

 Action Force (disambiguation)
 Action Jackson (disambiguation)
 Action Man (disambiguation)
 Action theory (disambiguation)
 Acteon (disambiguation)
 Actaeon (disambiguation)
 Acción (disambiguation)
 Structural load, forces, deformations, or accelerations applied to a structure or its components